Tischeria unicolor is a moth of the  family Tischeriidae. It is known from St. Croix in the Virgin Islands.

References

Tischeriidae
Moths described in 1897